Demba Ba (born 25 May 1985) is a former professional footballer. He serves as the chairman of National Independent Soccer Association side ASC San Diego.

He made his first-team debut with French team Rouen in 2005 before moving to Mouscron and then 1899 Hoffenheim in Germany in 2007. In 2011, he moved to Premier League side West Ham United. He played only 12 games for West Ham and despite being their league top goal scorer in the 2010–11 season, they were relegated to the Championship and Ba moved to Newcastle United. In January 2013, he completed a move to Chelsea for an undisclosed fee, before joining Beşiktaş for €6 million 18 months later. After one season in Turkey, he moved to Shanghai Shenhua of the Chinese Super League.

Born and raised in France, Ba was a full international for Senegal from 2007 to 2015 and represented the country at the 2012 Africa Cup of Nations. On 13 September 2021, he announced his retirement from football.

Early career
Ba was born in Sèvres, Hauts-de-Seine and is the sixth child of seven. He grew up in Saint-Valery-en-Caux, Seine-Maritime. He joined the youth section of ES Mont-Gaillard, located in Le Havre, in 1992, before playing for Port Autonome between 1999 and 2000, and then for Frileuse between 2000 and 2001.

In 2001, Ba returned to Châtillon and played for Montrouge. He played there until 2004, at which point he decided to concentrate on his football. Later that year, after unsuccessful trials at Lyon and Auxerre, Ba moved to the United Kingdom to seek a professional contract. He was recommended to Watford manager Ray Lewington through his friend Gauthier Diafutua, then a Watford player, but released shortly after Lewington's dismissal. Ba then spent a week on trial at Barnsley, and returned to France after two more unsuccessful trials at Football League sides Swansea City and Gillingham.

Club career

Rouen
Ba signed with manager Alain Michel because they were both moving to French club Rouen on a one-year contract, and Ba enjoyed a highly successful season with the club.

Mouscron
Belgian club Mouscron beat off competition from numerous other clubs to win Ba's signature in 2006. Scoring in each of his first three games, he then picked up fractures in his tibia and fibula, and was out of action between August 2006 and April 2007. Following his eight-month recovery period he scored seven goals in nine games, and picked up his first international cap.

1899 Hoffenheim

On 29 August 2007, Ba moved to 2. Bundesliga side 1899 Hoffenheim for €3 million. Ba was an integral part of Hoffenheim's promotion to the Bundesliga and their successful first season in the Bundesliga, where they finished seventh after leading during the Christmas break. In that season he scored 14 goals, only missing one game all season. These goals included a hat-trick in a 3–3 game against Stuttgart on 24 February 2009. In all competitions Ba scored 40 goals in 103 appearances for TSG 1899 Hoffenheim.
In July 2009, he was due to move to VfB Stuttgart, but the move fell through after he failed a medical. In December of that year Ba extended his contract at Hoffenheim to 2013.

Move to England
Ba left Hoffenheim for disputed reasons in January 2011. Claiming the club had gone back on an agreed transfer to a Premier League club, believed to be West Ham United, he refused to travel to Hoffenheim's winter training camp. In response, Hoffenheim's general manager said his contract would be cancelled, he would face legal action, and he would be fined and prevented from moving to another club for six months. The club also later claimed he travelled to England without permission in order to force a move, which they reluctantly agreed needs to happen due to Ba's actions. The club later agreed to a transfer to Stoke City for a reported fee of £7.1 million, but it fell through after Ba had agreed personal terms but failed his medical for undisclosed reasons. Expressing disappointment, Stoke City manager Tony Pulis said "Obviously they found something which could cause problems later".

After leaving Hoffenheim, the club's general manager Ernst Tanner stated the club stand by their decision selling Ba.

West Ham United

After the collapsed Stoke deal, Ba was sold to West Ham United for an undisclosed fee based on appearances. He signed a three-year contract on 28 January, on a pay as you play basis due to knee problems found in the Stoke medical. Ba's Premier League debut came on 6 February 2011, as a 75th-minute substitute for Robbie Keane during a 1–0 home defeat by Birmingham City. His first goals followed six days later during his full debut, scoring twice in a 3–3 draw against West Bromwich Albion. Despite finishing as their top scorer for the season with seven from twelve games including 2 in the last game, Ba's stay with West Ham proved to be short. Following their relegation to the Championship after a 3–2 loss away to Wigan Athletic he invoked a release clause in his contract allowing him to leave for free. He turned down a £50,000-a-week salary plus a bonus payment of £500,000 in order to stay in the Premier League with another club, triggering interest from both Everton and Newcastle United.

Newcastle United

2011–12 season
On 17 June 2011, Ba signed for Newcastle United on a three-year deal, making his club debut on 13 August 2011 in the 0–0 draw against Arsenal. His first goals for the club came on 24 September 2011 with a hat-trick against Blackburn Rovers in a 3–1 home win. A second hat-trick came in a 3–1 away win at Stoke City, taking his league total to 8 and maintaining the club's 11 game unbeaten league start, taking them to 3rd in the league. Ba's goalscoring form continued despite Newcastle entering a downward spell, and saw him picked in ESPN.com's Premier League Best XI for the first half of the season, and named Premier League Player of the Month for December 2011.

By the time Ba left to play in the January 2012 Africa Cup of Nations his league tally had reached 15, making him second top scorer in the league behind Arsenal's Robin van Persie. He left for the tournament on a high note, scoring the first in a 3–0 home win over Manchester United on 4 January 2012, the team's first victory against the league champions in over a decade. While at the Africa Cup of Nations tournament, Ba's Senegal teammate Papiss Cissé also signed for Newcastle. Ba and Cissé returned earlier than expected after Senegal finished bottom of their group, with Ba having missed three Premier League games and two FA Cup games, the second of which saw Newcastle knocked out of the cup. He returned to action against Aston Villa on their visit to St James' Park on 5 February 2012, his return proved to be a goal scoring one as he netted the opener in the game which Newcastle won 2–1. This would prove to be Ba's last goal of the season, as he moved to the left of a three pronged attack with Papiss Cissé leading the line, and grabbing 12 goals in the second half of the season. Despite this late season slump, Ba was voted as the best signing of the 2011–12 season by Premier League managers in March 2012. He finished the season as Newcastle's leading goal scorer, with 16 goals.

2012–13 season
Ba got his season off to a strong start scoring in a 1–0 win against Monaco, in Landsberg am Lech, Germany on 16 July 2012. He also scored in a 2–1 win against Braga which helped Newcastle win the Guadiana Trophy. In Newcastle's first league game against Tottenham, Ba opened the scoring with a fantastic volleyed effort in a 2–1 win. On 17 September 2012, he scored Newcastle's 1000th goal of the Premier League era, after scoring both goals in a 2–2 draw against Everton at Goodison Park. On 29 September, he scored for the third game in a row as he scored twice in a 2–2 draw away to Reading, the first a volley, the second however proved controversial as the ball struck his arm before going in.

It was known that Ba had a release clause in his contract valued at £7 million causing speculation of him making a transfer to Chelsea. This speculation was confirmed by Newcastle manager Alan Pardew on 2 January 2013 who said that the transfer was "done" and Ba would "go to Chelsea with our blessing."

Chelsea

2012–13 season
On 4 January 2013, Ba joined Chelsea for an undisclosed fee. Ba signed a three-and-a-half-year contract, becoming the second ever Senegalese player to join the club, after Isaac Esposito. He received the vacant number 29 shirt.
Ba made his debut against Southampton in the third round of the FA Cup on 5 January. He marked his first appearance for the club by scoring two goals in a 5–1 victory for Chelsea. He scored on his home league debut on 16 January in a 2–2 draw, also against Southampton. 

On 2 February 2013, Ba first played his former team Newcastle in a Premier League match at St. James' Park. In the 32nd minute of the match Ba had a chance to open the scoring but his initial attempt on goal was saved by Newcastle keeper Tim Krul. Ba managed to head the rebounded ball and in doing so collided with Coloccini. The collision resulted in a broken nose and Ba was substituted in the 43rd minute. Newcastle went on to win the game 3–2. After a run of seven games without scoring, Ba scored in a 1–0 win against West Bromwich Albion at Stamford Bridge on 2 March. On 1 April, Ba scored a goal from a long Juan Mata cross in the FA Cup quarter-final replay against Manchester United, giving Chelsea a 1–0 victory and a spot at Wembley against Manchester City in the semi-finals of the competition. He was cup-tied for Chelsea's victorious 2012–13 UEFA Europa League campaign.

2013–14 season

For the 2013–14 season, Ba's squad number was switched from 29 to 19, his squad number while at Newcastle. In the summer transfer window, Ba was linked with transfers to his former clubs Newcastle United and West Ham United. Ba was on the verge of joining Arsenal on a season-long loan, but the move fell through. It was later revealed that the move fell through thanks to Chelsea intervention, though Ba himself considered moving to Arsenal.

He scored his first goal of the season after coming on as a substitute in Champions League match against Schalke in a 3–0 victory. Ba's first Premier League goal of the season sealed Chelsea's 3–1 victory over Southampton. He made his first Champions League start on 11 December 2013 and he scored the only goal of the game, as Chelsea won 1–0 against Steaua București. On 8 March 2014, he scored twice after coming on as a 76th-minute substitute in a 4–0 win over Tottenham Hotspur.

On 8 April 2014, Ba scored an 87th-minute goal in the Champions League quarter-final second-leg against Paris Saint-Germain to send Chelsea through to the semi-finals. On 13 April, he scored the winning goal as Chelsea won 1–0 at Swansea City. On 27 April, during Chelsea's third final match against Liverpool, Steven Gerrard slipped over while receiving a pass which allowed Ba to score, resulting in Chelsea winning the game 2–0, helping them to stay in the race for the Premier League title. Having only scored 14 goals since his arrival in January 2013, Ba fell behind fellow strikers Samuel Eto'o and Fernando Torres, having spent most of the season being on the sidelines. After the arrival of Diego Costa in the summer, Chelsea decided to allow Ba to search for a new club despite his intention to stay for the 2014–15 season.

Beşiktaş

On 16 July 2014, Beşiktaş J.K. of the Turkish Süper Lig signed Ba from Chelsea for €6 million. He was given the number 9 shirt. 

Ba made his official competitive debut for the club against Feyenoord in the first-leg of third qualifying round of the 2014–15 UEFA Champions League, coming on as a substitute for Oğuzhan Özyakup in the 59th minute, as the match ended 2–1 for Beşiktaş.
In the second-leg in Istanbul, which was the first time he was in the starting eleven, Ba scored three goals, marking his first hat-trick with the Turkish club in which ended 3–1. On 19 August, Ba tried a straight shot right after the kick-off, which was saved by Arsenal keeper Wojciech Szczęsny at Play-off Round first leg, which ended 0–0.

Ba made a great start to Turkish top flight and scored eight times in 10 games for Besiktas over the first twelve weeks of the season. In UEFA Europa League, Ba proved to be instrumental for Besiktas' success and managed to score five times in five games while Besiktas advanced for the knockout phase.

Shanghai Shenhua
On 28 June 2015, it was confirmed that Ba had signed a three-year deal with Chinese Super League club Shanghai Shenhua. He made his debut on 11 July, starting in a 1–1 draw at Tianjin Teda, and scored his first goal four days later in a 3–1 home win over Beijing Guoan. Ba finished the season with six goals in 11 games, including a hat-trick in the final game on 31 October, a 3–1 win over Jiangsu Sainty, also at the Hongkou Stadium. Although Shanghai lost to Jiangsu Sainty in the 2015 Chinese FA Cup final, Ba won the titles of 2015 Chinese FA Cup Most Valuable Player and Top Scorer.

In Ba's second season at Shanghai Shenhua, he scored 14 goals in 18 Super League games, including hat-tricks in wins against Shijiazhuang Ever Bright on 3 April 2016, and Hangzhou Greentown on 19 June. On 17 July, Ba broke his leg during a match against Shanghai SIPG when he was knocked off balance by Sun Xiang and fell with his leg twisting under him. Shenhua coach Gregorio Manzano stated the injury could potentially "end his professional career." French doctor Olivier Bringer performed surgery on Ba's fractured leg successfully on 22 July. After the operation, Bringer affirmed that Ba would be able to play football in a few months.

Return to Turkey
On 31 January 2017, Beşiktaş confirmed that Ba will join the club on loan from Shanghai Shenhua until May 2017. On 31 January 2018, Ba joined Turkish Süper Lig side Göztepe S.K. on a free transfer. Ba scored seven goals and assisted one goal in 13 matches before rejoining Shanghai Shenhua.

Return to Shanghai Shenhua
Ba rejoined Shanghai Shenhua on 14 June 2018. On 18 July 2018, he made his return debut and scored the winning goal in a 1–0 home win over Tianjin TEDA.

İstanbul Başakşehir
In January 2019, Ba terminated his contract with Shenhua by mutual consent and joined Turkish club İstanbul Başakşehir.

On 19 July 2020, Ba became a champion of Turkey for a second time in his career as Başakşehir were crowned Süper Lig champions with a 1–0 win over Kayserispor. Ba netted in Başakşehir's 2–3 defeat to Kasımpaşa on the final day of the league season, finishing the campaign as the club's top league scorer with 13 goals.

FC Lugano
On 19 June 2021, Ba signed a one-year contract for Swiss Super League club FC Lugano on a free transfer. However, less than three months later on 13 September, Ba announced he had retired from professional football.

International career
Ba played a total of 22 games and scored three goals for Senegal.

Personal life
Ba is a practising Muslim. In 2013, He refused, like Papiss Cissé, Hatem Ben Arfa and Cheick Tioté, to wear the new sponsor's name on their shirts because Wonga.com is a British payday loan firm, and according to Sharia law, Muslims must not benefit from either lending money or receiving money from another person - meaning that charging interest is prohibited.

He observes fasting during the Islamic month of Ramadan, along with celebrating his goals by performing the Sujud by bowing towards Mecca. 

In 2014, when he played for Chelsea, Ba put his jersey up for sale at auction for financing Collective Against Islamophobia in France (CCIF). He declared after the Charlie Hebdo shooting: 

In 2017, He brings with Nicolas Anelka funding to the Pan-Africanist association created by Kémi Séba, an anti-colonial activist with several convictions for anti-Semitism. In August 2020, Ba called on football to condemn China's treatment of Uighurs.

On 26 June 2017, Ba co-founded with Eden Hazard, Yohan Cabaye and Moussa Sow an expansion North American Soccer League franchise, San Diego 1904 FC, to begin playing in 2018. In 2021, San Diego 1904 FC merged with Albion San Diego, which made Ba the head owner of the newly merged team.

Career statistics

Club

International
Source:

Scores and results list Senegal's goal tally first, score column indicates score after each Ba goal.

Honours
Beşiktaş
Süper Lig: 2016–17

İstanbul Başakşehir
Süper Lig: 2019–20

Individual
Premier League Player of the Month: December 2011
Chinese FA Cup Most Valuable Player: 2015
Chinese Super League Team of the Year: 2016

References

External links

 
 
 
 
 
 
 

1985 births
Living people
People from Sèvres
Footballers from Hauts-de-Seine
French footballers
Senegalese footballers
Association football forwards
FC Rouen players
R.E. Mouscron players
TSG 1899 Hoffenheim players
West Ham United F.C. players
Newcastle United F.C. players
Chelsea F.C. players
Beşiktaş J.K. footballers
Shanghai Shenhua F.C. players
Göztepe S.K. footballers
İstanbul Başakşehir F.K. players
FC Lugano players
Championnat National 2 players
Belgian Pro League players
2. Bundesliga players
Bundesliga players
Premier League players
Süper Lig players
Chinese Super League players
Swiss Super League players
Senegal international footballers
2012 Africa Cup of Nations players
French expatriate footballers
French expatriate sportspeople in Belgium
French expatriate sportspeople in Germany
French expatriate sportspeople in England
French expatriate sportspeople in Turkey
French expatriate sportspeople in China
French expatriate sportspeople in Switzerland
Senegalese expatriate footballers
Senegalese expatriate sportspeople in Belgium
Senegalese expatriate sportspeople in Germany
Senegalese expatriate sportspeople in England
Senegalese expatriate sportspeople in Turkey
Senegalese expatriate sportspeople in China
Senegalese expatriate sportspeople in Switzerland
Expatriate footballers in Belgium
Expatriate footballers in Germany
Expatriate footballers in England
Expatriate footballers in Turkey
Expatriate footballers in China
Expatriate footballers in Switzerland
French Muslims
Senegalese Muslims
Citizens of Senegal through descent
French sportspeople of Senegalese descent